University College Utrecht (UCU) provides English-language Liberal Arts and Sciences undergraduate education. Founded in 1998, as the first university college in the Netherlands, it is part of Utrecht University. Around 750 students of 70 different nationalities live and study on campus. Students can design their individual curriculum with courses in one of the three departments: Science, Social Sciences and Humanities.

All students follow a three-year bachelor programme. They graduate with a degree from Utrecht University, either a Bachelor of Science or a Bachelor of Arts.

Campus 
The campus is located at the former Kromhout Kazerne.
The classes are in three academic buildings. These stand around the central quad on both sides of the College Hall:

Voltaire houses the Humanities Domain which covers History, Philosophy, Religious Studies, Literature, Art History, Museum Studies, Linguistics and the Languages.
Locke houses the Social Sciences Domain which covers Law, Psychology, Political Sciences, Human Geography, Economics, Anthropology and Sociology.
Newton houses the Sciences Domain which covers Cognitive Neuroscience, Life Sciences, Mathematics, Physics, Chemistry, and Earth and Environment.

There is a fourth academic building, Descartes , that used to be integral to the UCU teaching environment, but is now part of the Utrecht School of Economics. The building previously housed the Academic Core courses, consisting of the mandatory courses at UCU such as the languages. Currently the Academic Core courses have no specific location, and the language courses are taught in the Voltaire building.

The Dining Hall building served as a military mess on the Kromhout Kazerne. The building now hosts the University College Student Association Bar, a cafetaria and café, a student gym, the University College Student Association Office, UC Student Council Office, and the Campus Affairs Representatives Office..

The Auditorium building used to serve as a military museum, but is now used for larger lectures and performances.

Admission
Students admission policy is based on merit, broad academic interest, and motivation. The application procedure includes submission of a letter of motivation, references, an English proficiency requirement, as well as an interview. University College Utrecht also provides financial aid to further help students.

Ranking
The Keuzegids (Dutch study choice guide) assesses about 400 bachelor programs on success rates, quality of education, quality of teaching, facilities and more. University College Utrecht has been awarded the Top Rated Programme quality seal since 2013 annually.

Accreditation 
University College Utrecht is accredited by the NVAO, the Accreditation Organization of the Netherlands and Flanders, and has consistently been in the top 5 in Elsevier Magazine’s survey among Dutch institutes of higher education. It is also rated positively by students in the annual National Student Survey (Nationale Studentenenquête or NSE).

Academic calendar
The academic year begins in the last week of August or first week of September and is divided in two semesters of 15 weeks (including one week Mid-term Break). Each semester a student takes 4 courses. There is an optional 5-week Summer Term, during which a student takes one course that can be used to acquire extra credit, to do a special course (such as a Laboratory Course), or to compensate for a failed course.

Courses
After their first year students elect a major in either Humanities, Social Sciences, Sciences, a double major in any two of these or an interdepartmental major in a combination of these. In the latter cases a student will have to make a convincing argument to the Director of Education. There are two double degree programmes on offer, combining the University College Utrecht curriculum with a degree in Law, or a degree in Physics.

Students are allowed to combine courses from different disciplines, thereby encouraging multidisciplinary research and interests. In any major a student needs to take 10 courses, of which three at the advanced level and in at least two different fields of study. This will lead to the BA degree (Bachelor of Arts). A BSc degree (Bachelor of Science) requires 12 courses in the Sciences department, the extra two courses being two lab courses to be taken in the Summer or Third term. Furthermore, a student is required to take at least one course in each department, learn one new foreign language, and pass the core course Research in Context, and one course appropriate to the major.

Each course is worth 7.5 ECTS credits. There is continuous assessment based on papers/essays, presentations, class participation and exams. Grades are on the A-F scale (A being equivalent to a GPA of 4.0). First year courses are not factored into the students final grade point average.

Exchange programmes
Apart from taking courses at other universities in the Netherlands, students have the opportunity to go on exchange to universities worldwide. University College Utrecht also accepts incoming exchange students from partner universities.

Alumni
University College Utrecht alumni are represented by the University College Alumni Association (UCAA).

Fees
The following figures apply to the academic year 2019-2020: Students from within the European Economic Area pay an annual tuition fee of €4,250, Non-EEA students pay €11,500. Campus fees are €6,050 per year and cover the general costs of living on campus and making use of the campus facilities. Water, electricity and internet connectivity are included. All students pay a contribution of €73 to the UCSA (University College Students Association).

References

External links
Official website University College Utrecht

Liberal arts colleges at universities in the Netherlands
Universities in the Netherlands
Utrecht University
Educational institutions established in 1999
1999 establishments in the Netherlands
Buildings and structures in Utrecht (city)